Atapharoy Bygrave (born 12 November 1993) is a Jamaican footballer who plays as a forward.

Club career

In 2016, Bygrave signed for Antiguan side Grenades. In 2019, he signed for Dunbeholden in Jamaica, helping them finish second place. He was top scorer of the 2022 National Premier League with 13 goals. In 2022, Bygrave signed for Vietnamese club TPHCM.

International career

Bygrave made his national team debut in March 2022.

References

External links

  

1998 births
Antigua and Barbuda Premier Division players
Association football forwards
August Town F.C. players
Dunbeholden F.C. players
Expatriate footballers in Antigua and Barbuda
Expatriate footballers in Vietnam
Grenades F.C. players
Ho Chi Minh City FC players
Jamaica international footballers
Jamaican expatriate footballers
Jamaican expatriate sportspeople in Vietnam
Jamaican footballers
Living people
National Premier League players
Tryum F.C. players
V.League 1 players